Rheomys is a genus of Mexican and Central American semiaquatic rodents in the family Cricetidae.

It contains the following species:
 Mexican water mouse, Rheomys mexicanus
 Goldman's water mouse, Rheomys raptor
 Thomas's water mouse, Rheomys thomasi
 Underwood's water mouse, Rheomys underwoodi

References

 
Rodent genera
Taxa named by Oldfield Thomas
Taxonomy articles created by Polbot